The Crown is a Grade II listed public house at High Street, Cowley, London.

It dates from the 16th century.

References

Grade II listed buildings in the London Borough of Hillingdon
Grade II listed pubs in London
Pubs in the London Borough of Hillingdon
Cowley, London